During the 2010–11 English football season, Brentford competed in Football League One. The mid-table season was memorable for runs to the final of the Football League Trophy and the fourth round of the League Cup.

Season summary 

After an impressive 9th-place finish at the end of the Brentford's first season in League One since 2006–07, manager Andy Scott signed almost an entirely new team. Released were centre back Mark Phillips and forward Steve Kabba and six players were transferred out during the off-season, with the most notable departures being left back Ryan Dickson to Championship club Southampton and captain Alan Bennett to League Two Wycombe Wanderers. 11 players were transferred in before the end of the summer transfer window, including two goalkeepers (Richard Lee, Simon Royce), four defenders (Pim Balkestein, David McCracken, Michael Spillane, Craig Woodman), two midfielders (Nicky Adams, Toumani Diagouraga) and forwards Gary Alexander and Kirk Hudson, with Nicky Forster returning to Griffin Park for the first time since his departure in 1997. Huddersfield Town forward Robbie Simpson was signed on a season-long loan.

Brentford opened the league season with a run of just two wins from the opening 11 matches, which left the club bottom of the table by late September 2010. However, some cheer was had in the League Cup, with the Bees progressing to the fourth round to equal the club record for its furthest progression in the competition. After seeing off League Two club Cheltenham Town in the first round, the Bees beat Championship side Hull City 2–1 at Griffin Park in the second round, clinching victory with an 88th-minute diving header from Marcus Bean. The victory set up a third round tie at with Premier League club Everton at Griffin Park. Gary Alexander cancelled out Séamus Coleman's early goal and the teams were locked together until full-time and through the extra time period. Goalkeeper Richard Lee was Brentford's hero in the penalty shootout, helping the club win the first of the four shootouts it would compete in during the season. The Bees took Premier League club Birmingham City to a shootout at St Andrew's in the fourth round after a 1–1 draw, but were knocked out.

Brentford recovered its form in League One between 2 October 2010 and 1 January 2011, winning 8 and losing just two matches of an 11-match spell, but manager Andy Scott was moved to complain to the press of the "negativity" surrounding the club, despite the run being achieved with players missing through injury and including a club-record equalling five consecutive away league wins. By early January the Bees had also progressed to the Southern Area finals of the Football League Trophy, but a draw in the first leg versus Exeter City was one of only two draws secured during an 8-match winless run which kicked off 2011. A 4–1 away defeat to bottom-place club Dagenham & Redbridge on 1 February led to calls from the Brentford supporters for the removal of Andy Scott as manager. Two days after the match, Scott and assistant manager Terry Bullivant were sacked and captain Kevin O'Connor remarking that the blame led with the players, for "making far too many individual mistakes".

Forward Nicky Forster was named as caretaker manager on 3 February 2011 and Brentford owner Matthew Benham brought in Mark Warburton as first team coach. An unbeaten run in his first six matches in all competitions led to Forster being named as manager until the end of the season. The run included a 2–1 away victory over Exeter City in the Football League Trophy Southern Area final second leg, which set up a Wembley final versus Carlisle United on 3 April. The Bees won four and lost three of the seven league matches preceding the final, which included a 2–1 victory over Carlisle United at Griffin Park. Brentford's third Football League Trophy final appearance ended with a 1–0 defeat, in which the Bees' "domination failed to yield a single shot on target" and midfielder Toumani Diagouraga was sent off for two bookable offences. In the aftermath of the defeat, Brentford meandered through the remainder of the league season to finish in 11th place.

League table

Results

Pre-season

League One

Results by round

Results summary

League position graph

Matches

FA Cup

Football League Cup

Football League Trophy

Playing squad 
Players' ages are as of the opening day of the 2010–11 season.

 Source: Soccerbase

Coaching staff

Andy Scott (7 August 2010 – 3 February 2011)

Nicky Forster (3 February – 7 May 2011)

Statistics

Appearances and goals
Substitute appearances in brackets.

 Players listed in italics left the club mid-season.
 Source: Soccerbase

Goalscorers 

 Players listed in italics left the club mid-season.
 Source: Soccerbase

Discipline 

 Players listed in italics left the club mid-season.
 Source: ESPN FC

Management

Summary

Transfers & loans

Kit
The 2010–11 Brentford kit designs were chosen by the club's supporters and launched on 9 July 2010.

|
|
|

|
|

Awards 
 Supporters' Player of the Year: Richard Lee
 Community Player of the Year: Leon Legge
 Football League One Manager of the Month: Andy Scott (October 2010)
 Football League Family Excellence Award

References

Brentford F.C. seasons
Brentford